Karl Thurman Davis, Sr. (April 16, 1908 – July 1, 1977) was an American professional wrestler best known by his ring name, Crippler Karl and Killer Karl Davis. Regarded as one of the most hated "heel performers" during the 1930s and 40s, he was given the "Crippler" moniker by Toronto sportswriter Johnny Fitzgerald after injuring Whipper Billy Watson during a  bout in Toronto. Davis is perhaps best remembered for his tenure in the Gulf Athletic Club where he won the Texas Heavyweight Championship once and Southern Heavyweight Championship three times. He was at one time a claimant to the original World Heavyweight Wrestling Championship, having decisions over Ed "Strangler" Lewis and Jim Londos, before his defeat by Chief Little Beaver in 1937. He also formed successful tag teams with Wee Willie Davis, both as themselves and masked wrestlers Los Hermanos Diablos, and Ted Christy in NWA Hollywood Wrestling between 1947 and 1955.

In his 35-year career, Davis wrestled for extended periods of time for various wrestling promotions: Al Haft Sports, the American Wrestling Association, Eastern Sports Enterprises, Fred Kohler Enterprises, Gulas-Welch Enterprises, Heart of America Sports Attractions, Internataional Wrestling Asssociation, Jack Pfefer Promotions, Jim Crockett Promotions, John J. Doyle Enterprises, Mike London Sports, Minneapolis Boxing & Wrestling Club, Pinkie George Promotions, Rocky Mountain Sports Enterprises, Queensbury Athletic Club, Salt Lake Wrestling Club, Sam Avey Inc., Sam Muchnick Sports Attractions, San Francisco Booking Office, Tom Packs Sports Enterprises, and Western States Sports.

After his initial retirement from professional wrestling, Brooks pursued a career in acting and became a popular character actor throughout the 1950s. A tall and striking individual he was frequently cast as a henchman.

Early life
A native of Columbus, Ohio, Davis attended Ohio State University and graduated in 1928 with a degree in civil engineering and physical education. A standout athlete in basketball, baseball, football, Davis was a four-sport letterman and selected as an All-American fullback in 1927–28. He pursued a career in professional sports and played for both the Philadelphia Yellowjackets and the St. Louis Cardinals. Davis achieved an 11–2 record before an injury ended his baseball career after playing one season.

Professional wrestling career
While still attending OSU, Davis began wrestling professionally in order to pay his way through school. He initially used the assumed name of "Joe Lawrence" and also wrestled under a mask. He eventually adopted the name Karl "Killer" Davis, and other names, appearing in almost 3,000 matches. One of the most hated "heel performers" in pro wrestling, he frequently had to leave the ring under a police escort and sustained numerous scars on his hands from attacks by irate wrestling fans. On July 20, 1938, after defeating Yvon Robert in a Best 2-out-of-3 Falls match at the Montreal Forum, a French-Canadian man broke through the police cordon and slashed him in the face. Davis required a total of 46 stitches (17 on the inside and 29 on the outside) on his lower lip. The fan, a government tax collector, was eventually arrested and served over a year in jail. 

Davis was suspended from competition for excessive violence several times during his career. He used his "shoulder bust" finisher to seriously injure four opponents over a 9-week period in Toronto. Officials finally took action against Davis for breaking the left shoulder of Vincent Lopez in front of 11,000 fans at the Grand Olympic Auditorium in 1947, issuing him an eight-month suspension. Davis was also one of June Byers' initial trainers, and who was discovered by women's wrestling manager Billy Wolfe while facing Davis in an intergender match at one of Morris Siegel's "Friday Night Wrestling" shows in Houston.

At age 41, Davis took up acting and made his feature film debut with a small role in the 1949 film Mighty Joe Young. Initially only in small, uncredited roles, he began to appear in cast lists from 1951 and received regular roles in both film and TV for a decade. Davis became a born-again Christian during the mid-1950s, appearing with fellow wrestlers Jules Strongbow and Tiny Roebuck at the Church of the Open Door for a Youth for Christ rally in June 1956, and was also ordained as a Pentecostal minister. In his later years, Davis was critical of the pro wrestling industry as it began to focus more on "gimmick characters", such as Gorgeous George and Classy Freddie Blassie, designed to appeal to television audiences. He cited this as one of the reasons for retiring from wrestling in 1957.

Retirement and later years
In 1962, Davis founded the private security firm Desert Security Patrol to protect homes and businesses in Hesperia, California. He had previously served 9 years as a patrolman with the Houston Police Department while wrestling for the Gulf Athletic Club. Within a few years, his company had a staff of six patrolmen and a radio operator. Working closely with the local sheriff's department, Desert Security Patrol was responsible for investigating a number of local crimes during the mid-1960s and, in August 1965, Davis personally captured a burglary suspect following a high speed chase. He was also an avid golfer and won numerous trophies competing in country club tournaments.

Davis was forced to step down as head of Desert Security Patrol after suffering a series of heart attacks. He died at his home on 1 July 1977 in Hesperia, and subsequently cremated at Montecito Memorial Park. At the time of his death, Davis was living alone, destitute and surviving on social security having lost most of his money through bad investments over the years.

Personal life
Davis married his first wife, Virginia Rexine Dye, on October 8, 1928. They had three children, Nancy Jean (1929–1995), Mona Lee (1929–1995) and Carl Jr. (1931–1994), before separating in the mid-1940s. He had two more children from a second marriage prior to marrying his third wife, Clara Louise Deburn (1927–2001) in Las Vegas, Nevada in 1956. Fellow wrestler Hans Schnabel served as his best man. Davis became the step father of her three children Bobbie (born 1948), Michael Steven (born 1953) and Ronald Bruce (1955–1998).

Filmography

Championships and accomplishments
 Gulf Athletic Club
 Southern Heavyweight Championship (Texas version) (3 times)
 Texas Heavyweight Championship (1 time)

References

External links
 Karl Davis at Cagematch.net
 
 Kark Davis at Wrestlingdata.com

1908 births
1977 deaths
People from Ohio
American wrestlers
American actors